Balacra herona is a moth of the family Erebidae. It was described by Herbert Druce in 1887. It is found in Cameroon, the Democratic Republic of the Congo, Ghana, Ivory Coast and Nigeria.

References

Balacra
Moths described in 1887
Insects of Cameroon
Insects of the Democratic Republic of the Congo
Insects of West Africa
Erebid moths of Africa